The U.S. Women's Open Championship is an open chess tournament that has been held irregularly.  From 1934 through at least 1966 it was held in conjunction with the annual U.S. Open Chess Championship.  After some years of inactivity, the event was reinstituted in 2009.

History
From 1934 through 1950 and in 1954, the women's tournaments were held as a round-robin tournament in conjunction with the U.S. Open.  From 1951 through 1978, with the exception of 1954, the women played in the U.S. Open with the title U.S. Women's Open Champion being awarded to the woman with the highest score.

After 1978, the title was not awarded until 2009.  That year the event was held again with sixteen players in a six-round tournament, in conjunction with the U.S. Senior Open Chess Championship and two other tournaments. Chess Life incorrectly called it the first U.S. Women's Open Championship. The highest-placing US citizen qualified for the U.S. Women's Chess Championship.

The event was then not held until 2015, when it was held in conjunction with the National Open in Las Vegas. It has been held each year since then, except for 2020 due to the COVID-19 pandemic.

Winners

Complete records of the Women's Open Championship are not available.

{| class="sortable wikitable"
|+
! Year !! Location !! Champions
|-
| 1934 || Chicago || 
|-
| 1937 || Chicago || 
|-
| 1938 || Boston || 
|-
| 1939 || New York City ||  
|-
| 1948 || Baltimore || 
|-
| 1950 || Detroit || 
|-
| 1951 || Fort Worth, Texas || 
|-
| 1953 || Milwaukee || 
|-
| 1954
 || New Orleans, Louisiana || 
|-
| 1955 || Long Beach, California || 
|-
| 1956 || Oklahoma City || 
|-
| 1957 || Cleveland || 
|-
| 1958 || Rochester, Minnesota || 
|-
| 1959 || Omaha, Nebraska || 
|-
| 1960 || St. Louis || 
|-
| 1961 || San Francisco || 
|-
| 1962 || San Antonio || 
|-
| 1963 || Chicago || 
|-
| 1964 || Boston || 
|-
| 1965 || Río Piedras, Puerto Rico || 
|-
| 1966 || Seattle || 
|-
| 1967 || Atlanta || 
|-
| 1968 || Aspen, Colorado || 
|-
| 1969 || Lincoln, Nebraska || 
|-
| 1970 || Boston || 
|-
| 1971 || Ventura, California || 
|- 
| 1972 || Atlantic City, New Jersey || 
|-
| 1973 ||  Chicago ||  
|-
| 1974 || New York City || 
|-
| 1975 || Lincoln, Nebraska || 
|-
| 1976 || Fairfax, Virginia || 
|-
| 1977 || Columbus, Ohio || 
|-
| 1978 || Phoenix, Arizona || 
|-
| 2009 || Tulsa, Oklahoma  || 
|-
| 2015 || Las Vegas || 
|-
| 2016 || Las Vegas || 
|-
| 2017 || Las Vegas || 
|-
| 2018 || Las Vegas || 
|-
| 2019 || Las Vegas || 
|-
| 2021 || Las Vegas || 
|}

See also
U.S. Open Chess Championship
U.S. Women's Chess Championship
U.S. Chess Championship

Notes

References
 (History and winners list of the tournament through 1966.)
  For years 1967–1971 and 1974–1978, U.S. Open prize lists from Chess Life were consulted.

External links
 2009 website

Chess competitions
Women's chess competitions
Chess in the United States
1934 establishments in Illinois
Recurring events established in 1934
1934 in chess